Sir Leon Bagrit (13 March 1902 – 22 April 1979) was a leading British industrialist and pioneer of automation.

Early life and education
Born to Jewish parents in Kiev, in the Russian Empire (present-day Ukraine), Sir Leon studied law at Birkbeck College in the University of London, formed his own company in 1935, and for many years headed the revamped firm of Elliott-Automation Ltd., which, outside the United States, was the largest computer manufacturer in the world.

Career
Leon Bagrit was a member of the Council for Scientific and Industrial Research, 1963–1965 and the Advisory Council on Technology, 1964-1979.  He was a director of the Royal Opera House, Covent Garden, 1962-1970.  He founded the Friends of Covent Garden, and chaired it, 1962-1969.  In 1964, he was invited by the BBC to present the Reith Lectures. Across six broadcasts, titled The Age of Automation, he explored how the increased technological development of the time would change people's lifestyles, and the wider world.

Due to the generosity of the Bagrit Trust, a dedicated building, the Sir Leon Bagrit Centre, was opened in the summer of 1991. This Centre formed a cornerstone of the Department of Bioengineering at Imperial College London and the next step in the development of bioengineering at Imperial.

See also
List of Jews born in the Russian Empire and the Soviet Union
List of British Jews
List of Ukrainian Jews
List of Old Olavians
 Who was Who
 Oxford Dictionary of National Biography

References

External links
 Time Magazine
 The BBC Reith Lectures: The Age of Automation

1902 births
1979 deaths
Businesspeople from Kyiv
People from Kievsky Uyezd
Ukrainian Jews
Soviet emigrants to the United Kingdom
British people of Ukrainian-Jewish descent
20th-century Ukrainian people
People educated at St Olave's Grammar School
20th-century British businesspeople
Alumni of Birkbeck, University of London